Rautavaara Airfield  ( or ) is an airfield in Rautavaara, Finland, about  southwest of Rautavaara municipal centre.

References

External links

VFR Suomi/Finland – Rautavaara Aerodrome
Lentopaikat.net – Rautavaara Airfield 
Rautavaaran lentokeskus 

Airports in Finland